The First National Bank Building is a U-shaped, fourteen-story, historic steel structure building located on the corner of 16th and Farnam street in Downtown Omaha, Nebraska. The building was constructed in 1917. It was the original building for the First National Bank as well as the first high-rise building built in Omaha. At 210 feet (64 m), it is the 17th tallest building in the city and its unique structure makes it a landmark in downtown Omaha.

Renovations in 2000 converted a majority of the building from office space to residential. Currently, the first floor acts as a lobby for residents of the building. A separate partition houses retail, restaurants and another separate entrance exists for the 27 offices located on the second and third floors. Floors four through fourteen contain 81 luxury one- and two-bedroom condominiums.

When the building was remodeled and turned into condominiums, a library, gym, and basement storage were added.

References

External links 

 Owner's website

Office buildings completed in 1917
Skyscraper office buildings in Omaha, Nebraska
National Register of Historic Places in Omaha, Nebraska
Renaissance Revival architecture in Nebraska
Bank buildings on the National Register of Historic Places in Nebraska
Residential skyscrapers in Omaha, Nebraska
1917 establishments in Nebraska